Río del Oro may refer to:
Río del Oro (Chile)
Río del Oro (Colombia)
Río del Oro (Mexico)
Río del Oro (Spain)

See also
Río de Oro (disambiguation)